The garden strawberry (or simply strawberry; Fragaria × ananassa) is a widely grown hybrid species of the genus Fragaria, collectively known as the strawberries, which are cultivated worldwide for their fruit. The fruit is widely appreciated for its characteristic aroma, bright red color, juicy texture, and sweetness. It is consumed in large quantities, either fresh or in such prepared foods as jam, juice, pies, ice cream, milkshakes, and chocolates. Artificial strawberry flavorings and aromas are also widely used in products such as candy, soap, lip gloss, perfume, and many others.

The garden strawberry was first bred in Brittany, France, in the 1750s via a cross of Fragaria virginiana from eastern North America and Fragaria chiloensis, which was brought from Chile by Amédée-François Frézier in 1714. Cultivars of Fragaria × ananassa have replaced, in commercial production, the woodland strawberry (Fragaria vesca), which was the first strawberry species cultivated in the early 17th century.

The strawberry is not, from a botanical point of view, a berry. Technically, it is an aggregate accessory fruit, meaning that the fleshy part is derived not from the plant's ovaries but from the receptacle that holds the ovaries. Each apparent "seed" (achene) on the outside of the fruit is actually one of the ovaries of the flower, with a seed inside it.

In 2019, world production of strawberries was nine million tons, led by China with 40% of the total.

History 

The first garden strawberry was grown in Brittany, France, during the late 18th century. Prior to this, wild strawberries and cultivated selections from wild strawberry species were the common source of the fruit.

The strawberry fruit was mentioned in ancient Roman literature in reference to its medicinal use. The French began taking the strawberry from the forest to their gardens for harvest in the 14th century. Charles V, France's king from 1364 to 1380, had 1,200 strawberry plants in his royal garden. In the early 15th century western European monks were using the wild strawberry in their illuminated manuscripts. The strawberry is found in Italian, Flemish, and German art, and in English miniatures. The entire strawberry plant was used to treat depressive illnesses.

By the 16th century, references of cultivation of the strawberry became more common. People began using it for its supposed medicinal properties and botanists began naming the different species. In England the demand for regular strawberry farming had increased by the mid-16th century.

The combination of strawberries and cream was created by Thomas Wolsey in the court of King Henry VIII. Instructions for growing and harvesting strawberries showed up in writing in 1578. By the end of the 16th century three European species had been cited: F. vesca, F. moschata, and F. viridis. The garden strawberry was transplanted from the forests and then the plants would be propagated asexually by cutting off the runners.

Two subspecies of F. vesca were identified: F. sylvestris alba and F. sylvestris semperflorens. The introduction of F. virginiana from eastern North America to Europe in the 17th century is an important part of history because it is one of the two species that gave rise to the modern strawberry. The new species gradually spread through the continent and did not become completely appreciated until the end of the 18th century. A French excursion journeyed to Chile in 1712, which led to the introduction of a strawberry plant with female flowers that resulted in the common strawberry.

The Mapuche and Huilliche Indians of Chile cultivated the female strawberry species until 1551, when the Spanish came to conquer the land. In 1765, a European explorer recorded the cultivation of F. chiloensis, the Chilean strawberry. At first introduction to Europe, the plants grew vigorously, but produced no fruit.  French gardeners in Brest and Cherbourg around the mid-18th century first noticed that when F. moschata and F. virginiana were planted in between rows of F. chiloensis, the Chilean strawberry would bear abundant and unusually large fruits. Soon after, Antoine Nicolas Duchesne began to study the breeding of strawberries and made several discoveries crucial to the science of plant breeding, such as the sexual reproduction of the strawberry which he published in 1766. Duchesne discovered that the female F. chiloensis plants could only be pollinated by male F. moschata or F. virginiana plants. This is when the Europeans became aware that plants had the ability to produce male-only or female-only flowers.

Duchesne determined F. ananassa to be a hybrid of F. chiloensis and F. virginiana. F. ananassa, which produces large fruits, is so named because it resembles the pineapple in smell, taste and berry shape. In England, many varieties of F. ananassa were produced, and they form the basis of modern varieties of strawberries currently cultivated and consumed. Further breeding were also conducted in Europe and America to improve the hardiness, disease resistance, size, and taste.

Description and growth

Strawberries are often grouped according to their flowering habit. Traditionally, this has consisted of a division between "June-bearing" strawberries, which bear their fruit in the early summer and "ever-bearing" strawberries, which often bear several crops of fruit throughout the season. One plant throughout a season may produce 50 to 60 times or roughly once every three days.

Research published in 2001 showed that strawberries actually occur in three basic flowering habits: short-day, long-day, and day-neutral. These refer to the day-length sensitivity of the plant and the type of photoperiod that induces flower formation. Day-neutral cultivars produce flowers regardless of the photoperiod.

Cultivation 

Strawberry cultivars vary widely in size, color, flavor, shape, degree of fertility, season of ripening, liability to disease and constitution of plant. On average, a strawberry has about 200 seeds on its external membrane. Some vary in foliage, and some vary materially in the relative development of their sexual organs. In most cases, the flowers appear hermaphroditic in structure, but function as either male or female.

For purposes of commercial production, plants are propagated from runners and, in general, distributed as either bare root plants or plugs. Cultivation follows one of two general models—annual plasticulture, or a perennial system of matted rows or mounds. Greenhouses produce a small amount of strawberries during the off season.

The bulk of modern commercial production uses the plasticulture system. In this method, raised beds are formed each year, fumigated, and covered with plastic to prevent weed growth and erosion. Plants, usually obtained from northern nurseries, are planted through holes punched in this covering, and irrigation tubing is run underneath. Runners are removed from the plants as they appear, to encourage the plants to put most of their energy into fruit development. After harvesting, the plastic is removed and the plants are plowed into the ground. Strawberry plants produce more and better fruit when they are young. After a year or two, they decline. Replacing them annually improves yields and enables denser planting. However, this necessitates a longer growing season, for the plants to establish themselves.  It also costs more to annually purchase plants, form new mounds, and cover them with (new) plastic.

The other major method retains plants for multiple years. This is most common in colder climates. The plants are grown in rows or on mounds. This method requires lower investment and lower maintenance, overall. Yields are typically lower than in plasticulture.

Another method uses a compost sock. Plants grown in compost socks have been shown to produce significantly more flavonoids, anthocyanins, fructose, glucose, sucrose, malic acid, and citric acid than fruit produced in the black plastic mulch or matted row systems. Similar results in an earlier study conducted by USDA confirms how compost plays a role in the bioactive qualities of two strawberry cultivars.

Strawberries may also be propagated by seed, though this is primarily a hobby activity, and is not widely practiced commercially. A few seed-propagated cultivars have been developed for home use, and research into growing from seed commercially is ongoing. Seeds (achenes) are acquired either via commercial seed suppliers, or by collecting and saving them from the fruit.

Strawberries can also be grown indoors in strawberry pots. Strawberries won't grow indoors in winter unless aided by a combination of blue and red LED lights. In southern lands, such as Florida, winter is the natural growing season and harvesting begins in mid-November.

The Kashubian strawberry (Truskawka kaszubska or Kaszëbskô malëna) is the first Polish fruit to be given commercial protection under EU law. It is produced in Kartuzy, Kościerzyna and Bytów counties and in the municipalities of Przywidz, Wejherowo, Luzino, Szemud, Linia, Łęczyce and Cewice in Kashubia. Only the following varieties may be sold as kaszëbskô malëna: Senga Sengana, Elsanta, Honeoye that have been graded as Extra or Class I.

Manuring and harvesting 
Most strawberry plants are now fed with artificial fertilizers, both before and after harvesting, and often before planting in plasticulture.

To maintain top quality, berries are harvested at least every other day. The berries are picked with the caps still attached and with at least half an inch of stem left. Strawberries need to remain on the plant to fully ripen because they do not continue to ripen after being picked. Rotted and overripe berries are removed to minimize insect and disease problems. The berries do not get washed until just before consumption.

Soil test information and plant analysis results are used to determine fertility practices. Nitrogen fertilizer is needed at the beginning of every planting year. There are normally adequate levels of phosphorus and potash when fields have been fertilized for top yields. To provide more organic matter, a cover crop of wheat or rye is planted in the winter before planting the strawberries. Strawberries prefer a pH from 5.5 to 6.5, so lime is usually not applied.

The harvesting and cleaning process has not changed substantially over time. The delicate strawberries are still harvested by hand. Grading and packing often occurs in the field, rather than in a processing facility. In large operations, strawberries are cleaned by means of water streams and shaking conveyor belts.

Pests 

Around 200 species of pests are known to attack strawberries both directly and indirectly. These pests include slugs, moths, fruit flies, chafers, strawberry root weevils, strawberry thrips, strawberry sap beetles, strawberry crown moth, mites, aphids, and others. The caterpillars of a number of species of Lepidoptera feed on strawberry plants. For example, the ghost moth is known to be a pest of the strawberry plant.

The strawberry aphid, Chaetosiphon fragaefolii, is a bug species found in the United States (Arizona), Argentina and Chile. It is a vector of the strawberry mild yellow-edge virus.

The amounts of pesticides required for industrial production of strawberries ( in California per acre) have led to the strawberry leading the list of EWG's "Dirty Dozen" of pesticide-contaminated produce.

Diseases 

Strawberry plants can fall victim to a number of diseases, especially when subjected to stress. The leaves may be infected by powdery mildew, leaf spot (caused by the fungus Sphaerella fragariae), leaf blight (caused by the fungus Phomopsis obscurans), and by a variety of slime molds. The crown and roots may fall victim to red stele, verticillium wilt, black root rot, and nematodes. The fruits are subject to damage from gray mold (Botrytis cinerea), rhizopus rot, and leather rot. To prevent root-rotting, strawberries should be planted every four to five years in a new bed, at a different site.

The , AtNPR1, confers A. thalianas broad-spectrum resistance when transexpressed in F. ananassa. This resistance includes resistance to anthracnose, powdery mildew, and angular leaf spot.

A 1997 study assessed many  and found all  effective against gray mold (B. cinerea). Both Tribute and Chandler were tested and benefited from the treatments, although there are large differences between the substance x variety effects. Strawberry metabolizes these volatiles, and does so more rapidly than either blackberry or grape.

The plants can also develop disease from temperature extremes during winter. Watering strawberry roots, and not the leaves, is preferred as moisture on leaves encourages fungal growth. Strawberries may also often appear conjoined together or deformed due to poor pollination.

Domestic cultivation 

Strawberries are popular in home gardens, and numerous cultivars have been selected for consumption and for exhibition purposes. The following cultivars have gained the Royal Horticultural Society's Award of Garden Merit:

Production

In 2020, world production of strawberries was 8.9 million tonnes, led by China with 38% of the total, and the United States and Egypt as other significant producers (see table).

Due the relatively fragile nature of the strawberry, approximately 35 percent of the $2.2 billion United States crop was spoiled in 2020. This led to an Idaho company planning to launch gene-edited strawberries in the near future in an effort to make them more durable and hardier. In the U.S. it costs growers around $35,000 per acre to plant and $35,000 per acre to harvest strawberries now, and more durable berries might reduce the rate of spoilage.

Marketing

In the United States in 2017, the collective commercial production of strawberries, blueberries, raspberries, and blackberries was a $6 billion industry dominated by the California growing and marketing company Driscoll's. In 2017, strawberries alone were a $3.5 billion market of which 82% was for fresh fruit.

To increase consumer demand in the 21st century, commercial producers of strawberries cultivated them mainly for favorable aroma characteristics similar to those of wild strawberries, in addition to having large size, heart-shape, glossy red exterior, firmness, and slow ripening for long shelf-life favorable to ship by ground transportation from farms to stores nationwide for consumption within two weeks of harvest. In US and Canadian grocery stores, fresh strawberries are typically sold in plastic clamshells, and are among the top fresh produce items in grocery revenues. One marketing analysis identified strawberries and other berries as a source of "happiness" for consumers.

Culinary 

In addition to being consumed fresh, strawberries can be frozen or made into jam or preserves, as well as dried and used in prepared foods, such as cereal bars. Strawberries and strawberry flavorings are a popular addition to dairy products, such as strawberry milk, strawberry ice cream, strawberry milkshakes/smoothies and strawberry yogurts.

In the United Kingdom, "strawberries and cream" is a popular dessert consumed at the Wimbledon tennis tournament. Strawberries and cream is also a staple snack in Mexico, usually available at ice cream parlors. In Sweden, strawberries are a traditional dessert served on Midsummer's Eve. Depending on area, strawberry pie, strawberry rhubarb pie, or strawberry shortcake are also common. In Greece, strawberries may be sprinkled with sugar and then dipped in Metaxa, a brandy, and served as a dessert. In Italy, strawberries are used for various desserts and as a common flavoring for gelato (gelato alla fragola).

Nutrients 

Raw strawberries are 91% water, 8% carbohydrates, 1% protein, and contain negligible fat (table). A 100 gram reference amount of strawberries supplies 33 kilocalories, is a rich source of vitamin C (71% of the Daily Value, DV), a good source of manganese (18% DV), and provides several other vitamins and dietary minerals in small amounts. Strawberries contain a modest amount of essential unsaturated fatty acids in the achene (seed) oil.

Phytochemicals 

Garden strawberries contain the dimeric ellagitannin agrimoniin which is an isomer of sanguiin H-6. Other polyphenols present include flavonoids, such as anthocyanins, flavanols, flavonols and phenolic acids, such as hydroxybenzoic acid and hydroxycinnamic acid. Strawberries contain fisetin and possess higher levels of this flavonoid than other fruits. Although achenes comprise only about 1% of total fresh weight of a strawberry, they contribute 11% of the total polyphenol in the whole fruit; achene phytochemicals include ellagic acid, ellagic acid glycosides, and ellagitannins.

Color 
Pelargonidin-3-glucoside is the major anthocyanin in strawberries and cyanidin-3-glucoside is found in smaller proportions. Although glucose seems to be the most common substituting sugar in strawberry anthocyanins, rutinose, arabinose, and rhamnose conjugates have been found in some strawberry cultivars.

Purple minor pigments consisting of dimeric anthocyanins (flavanol-anthocyanin adducts : catechin(4α→8)pelargonidin 3-O-β-glucopyranoside, epicatechin(4α→8)pelargonidin 3-O-β-glucopyranoside, afzelechin(4α→8)pelargonidin 3-O-β-glucopyranoside and epiafzelechin(4α→8)pelargonidin 3-O-β-glucopyranoside) can also be found in strawberries.

Flavor and fragrance 

As strawberry flavor and fragrance are characteristics that may appeal to consumers, they are used widely in a variety of manufacturing, including foods, beverages, confections, perfumes and cosmetics.

Sweetness, fragrance and complex flavor are favorable attributes. In plant breeding and farming, emphasis is placed on sugars, acids, and volatile compounds, which improve the taste and fragrance of a ripe strawberry. Esters, terpenes, and furans are chemical compounds having the strongest relationships to strawberry flavor and fragrance, with a total of 31 out of some 360 volatile compounds significantly correlated to favorable flavor and fragrance. In breeding strawberries for the commercial market in the United States, the volatile compounds, methyl anthranilate and gamma-decalactone prominent in aromatic wild strawberries, are especially desired for their "sweet and fruity" aroma characteristics.

Chemicals present in the fragrance of strawberries include:

 methyl acetate
 (E)-2-hexen-1-ol
 (E)-2-hexenal
 (E)-2-pentenal
 (E,E)-2,4-hexadienal
 (Z)-2-hexenyl acetate
 (Z)-3-hexenyl acetate
 1-hexanol
 2-heptanol
 2-heptanone
 2-methyl butanoic acid
 2-methylbutyl acetate
 alpha-terpineol
 amyl acetate
 amyl butyrate
 benzaldehyde
 benzyl acetate
 butyl acetate
 butyl butyrate
 butyl hexanoate
 butyric acid
 octanoic acid
 decyl acetate
 decyl butyrate
 d-limonene
 ethyl 2-methylbutanoate
 ethyl 3-methylbutanoate
 ethyl acetate
 ethyl benzoate
 ethyl butyrate
 ethyl decanoate
 ethyl hexanoate
 ethyl octanoate
 ethyl pentanoate
 ethyl propanoate
 ethyl-2-hexenoate
 α-farnesene
 β-farnesene
 furaneol
 γ-decalactone
 γ-dodecalactone
 heptanoic acid
 n-hexanal
 hexanoic acid
 hexyl acetate
 isoamyl acetate
 isoamyl hexanoate
 isopropyl acetate
 isopropyl butanoate
 isopropyl hexanoate
 linalool
 mesifurane
 methyl anthranilate
 methyl butyrate
 methyl hexanoate
 methyl isovalerate
 methyl octanoate
 methyl pentanoate
 methyl propanoate
 (E)-nerolidol
 nonanal
 nonanoic acid
 ocimenol
 octyl acetate
 octyl butyrate
 octyl hexanoate
 octyl isovalerate
 propyl butyrate
 propyl hexanoate

Genetics 
Modern strawberries are octoploid (8 sets of chromosomes). The genome sequence of the garden strawberry was published in 2019.

Allergy 
Some people experience an anaphylactoid reaction to eating strawberries. The most common form of this reaction is oral allergy syndrome, but symptoms may also mimic hay fever or include dermatitis or hives, and, in severe cases, may cause breathing problems. Proteomic studies indicate that the allergen may be tied to a protein for the red anthocyanin biosynthesis expressed in strawberry ripening, named Fra a1 (Fragaria allergen1). Homologous proteins are found in birch pollen and apple, suggesting that people may develop cross-reactivity to all three species.

White-fruited strawberry cultivars, lacking Fra a1, may be an option for strawberry allergy sufferers. Since they lack a protein necessary for normal ripening by anthocyanin synthesis of red pigments, they do not turn the mature berries of other cultivars red. They ripen but remain white, pale yellow or "golden", appearing like immature berries; this also has the advantage of making them less attractive to birds. A virtually allergen-free cultivar named 'Sofar' is available.

See also 

 California Strawberry Commission
 Fraise Tagada (strawberry-shaped candy popular in France)
 List of culinary fruits
 List of strawberry cultivars
 List of strawberry dishes
 List of strawberry topics
 Musk strawberry (hautbois strawberry)
 Plant City, Florida (winter strawberry capital of the world)
 Pineberry
 Pomology
 Strawberry cake
 Strawberry sauce

References

External links 

 Fragaria × ananassa data from GRIN Taxonomy Database
 
 
 

Strawberries
Fragaria
Hybrid fruit
Articles containing video clips
Crops
Symbols of Delaware
Berries